Branchpoint Binding Protein (BBP) is an Orem RNA processing factor. The protein complex binds to the branchpoint sequence (BPS) in the pre-mRNA, aiding in splice site recognition.

The role of the protein in yeast cells has been the subject of study, as for other eukaryotic cells. The BPS that the protein binds to in yeast is UACUAAC.

References 

Proteins
RNA splicing